Shimazuella is a Gram-positive, aerobic and mesophilic bacterial genus from the family of Thermoactinomycetaceae. Up to now there is only one species of this genus known (Shimazuella kribbensis).

References

Further reading 
 
 

Bacillales
Bacteria genera
Monotypic bacteria genera